The Gandhi Murder is a 2019 historical political thriller film directed by Karim Traïdia and Pankaj Sehgal. It examines the events leading to the assassination of Mahatma Gandhi. It stars Stephen Lang, Luke Pasqualino, Om Puri and Vinnie Jones.

Plot
The film posits that the assassination of Gandhi was aided and abetted by the British, exploiting weaknesses and political divisions in India's police and security services. Three Indian police officers (Lang, Pasqualino and Puri) try to stop this.

Cast

 Stephen Lang as D.I.G Sunil Raina 
 Luke Pasqualino as DCP Jimmy 
 Om Puri as T.G.
 Vinnie Jones as Sir Norman Smith 
 Vikas Shrivastav as Nathuram Godse
 Jesus Sans as Gandhi
 Bobbie Phillips as Elizabeth 
 Mark Moses as Sir Percy Sillitoe 
 Rajit Kapur as Jawaharlal Nehru
 Elissar as Edwina – Seductress
 Nassar as SSP Ashok
Vivaan Tiwari as Inspector Onkar
Raajpal Yadav as DSP Singh
Gregory Schwabe as Lord Mountbatten
Colton Tapp as John Booth
Anant Mahadevan as Professor Jain 
Avtar Gill as Sardar Patel
Govind Namdeo as Morarji Desai; D.S. Parchure
Joseph K. Bevilacqua as Abraham Lincoln
Behzad Khan as Vishnu Karkare 
Sachin Nikam as DSP Doel
Lisa Holsappel-Marrs as Edwina Mountbatten
Ravi Gossain as Nana
Gaurav Mohindra as Sub Inspector Deshmukh
Vishal Om Prakash as Inspector (CID) Raj
Alessa Novelli as Emily
Alen Thomson as Madan Lal
Amit Verma as Samsher
Pankaj Sehgal as Sam
Chetan Arora as ACP Rao Saheb Gurtu

Reception
The Guardian panned the film, awarding it one star and criticizing the strange casting choices (such as Lang as an Indian character) and poor production values. The New York Times was equally critical, questioning the basis of the film and calling the production 'shoddy'. The Los Angeles Times called the script 'clunky' and said 'Its timely messages become muted amid a kaleidoscope of settings, characters, brusque action scenes, blunt speechifying and wan romance.'

See also
 List of artistic depictions of Mahatma Gandhi

References

External links
 
 

2019 films
2010s historical thriller films
British historical films
British Indian films
Cultural depictions of Mahatma Gandhi
English-language Indian films
Films about Mahatma Gandhi
Films set in India
Films set in the 1940s
Films set in the partition of India
Films set in the Indian independence movement
Works about the Mahatma Gandhi assassination
Cultural depictions of Jawaharlal Nehru
Cultural depictions of Vallabhbhai Patel
Morarji Desai
2010s English-language films
2010s British films